Mezraoua is a commune in the Taounate Province of the Taza-Al Hoceima-Taounate administrative region of Morocco. At the time of the 2004 census, the commune had a total population of 9883 people living in 1661 households.

References

Populated places in Taounate Province
Rural communes of Fès-Meknès